Warren T. Brookes (1929 – December 28, 1991) was a journalist with the Boston Herald and the Detroit News and a nationally syndicated columnist known for his conservative political and economic views.

Biography 

Brookes graduated in 1952 from Harvard University with honors in economics and was thereafter employed by the Kimberly-Clark Corporation. In 1975, he joined the
Boston Herald; a decade later he joined the editorial page staff of the Detroit News. His column, written from Washington, D.C., appeared in sixty
newspaper on Mondays and Thursdays. He frequently challenged liberal economic and environmental ideas.

The Competitive Enterprise Institute, shortly before his passing, established the Warren T. Brookes Journalism Fellowship to identify and train journalists who wish to improve their knowledge of environmental issues and free market economics. The American Legislative Exchange Council (ALEC) presents the annual Warren Brookes Award for Excellence in Journalism.

Brookes was posthumously awarded the 1992 Gerald Loeb Award for Commentary.

Books 
 The Economy in Mind, Universe Pub, 1984

References

External links
 

1929 births
1991 deaths
American columnists
Harvard College alumni
People from Lovettsville, Virginia
Competitive Enterprise Institute
Gerald Loeb Award winners for Columns, Commentary, and Editorials
20th-century American journalists
American male journalists